Mogán is a town and a Spanish municipality in the southwestern part of the island of Gran Canaria, which is one of the three main islands making up the Province of Las Palmas in the Canary Islands, Spain.

Geography

Mogán is the second largest municipality by area on the island. It includes the fishing towns of Puerto de Mogán and Arguineguín. Much of the population lives on the Atlantic coastline. The town of Mogán is about 8 kilometres from the coast, 11 km north of Puerto Rico de Gran Canaria and 40 km south-west of Las Palmas. The GC-1 motorway passes through the south of the municipality. There is a string of tourist resorts along the coast.

The main settlements are:
 Arguineguín
 Cornisa del Suroeste
 Mogán
 Playa de Mogán 
 Puerto de Mogán
 Puerto Rico

Population

Heritage sites

Archaeology 
Three sites on the municipality grounds are listed Property of cultural interest in the "archaeological zone" category:

The Cats' ravine (cañada de los Gatos or Lomo los Gatos) is located at the mouth of the Mogan ravine that opens onto Mogan beach.

The valley of the Sea (cañada de la Mar) was also declared Property of cultural interest as archaeological zone, in 2005.

Veneguera's "Cogolla" (La Cogolla de Veneguera) is in the upper part of the Veneguera ravine in the north-west of the municipality.

Ethnology 
Mogan's windmill ("molino quemado de Mogán" is listed since 2002 as Heritage site in the category "ethnological site".

See also
List of municipalities in Las Palmas

Notes and references

Notes

References

External links
 Mogán tourism

Municipalities in Gran Canaria